Jeremy Cotter (born 1967/1968) is a New Zealand rugby union coach. He is the former head coach of the Manawatu provincial side who compete in the Mitre 10 Cup. He is the brother of Vern Cotter, the current coach at Montpellier Hérault Rugby.

Cotter originated from the town of Te Puke in the Bay Of Plenty.

Playing career
As a player Cotter played in the lock and loose forward positions. He played for the Te Puke club. Unfortunately he never made it to a provincial level, however he did represent the Western Bay of Plenty sub-union.

He spent 1986 attending Massey University in Palmerston North, where he played for Manawatu U-18s.

Coaching career
After not reaching any serious achievements as a player for Te Puke, Cotter became the team's coach and in 2011 lead them to their first Baywide (senior rugby competition) title.

He coached the Bay of Plenty Development side.

In 2013, Cotter received an offer from the Manawatu Turbos to become their forwards coach. He accepted.

In 2015 head coach of the Turbos Jason O'Halloran announced he would be leaving New Zealand for Scotland to become an assistant for the national team, joining Cotter's brother, Vern in the coaching staff.

The Manawatu Rugby Union then announced that Cotter would become head coach of the team for the 2016 season.

Personal
Outside of rugby, Cotter has a wife and three children. He also has a sheep and beef farm in western Bay of Plenty, near Te Puke. As well as running a farm he also owns a contracting business.

References

New Zealand rugby union coaches
Living people
1960s births
People from Te Puke